Bacqueville de la Potherie, also known as Claude-Charles Le Roy, was a French chronicler of New France.

His most famous work is Histoire de I'Amérique septentrionale, an account of French expeditions to the Great Lakes and Mississippi region in the late 17th century. This book was written in 1702 but not published until 1722.

References

External links

18th-century French historians
Year of death unknown
Year of birth unknown
French male writers
Historians of Colonial North America